Luynes is a commune in the Indre-et-Loire department in central France.

Population

Sights 
The Castle of Luynes has been registered as a historic site since 1926. The construction started in the 13th century, and the building was redesigned in the 15th and 17th century.

A Roman aqueduct which carried water to Tours is visible as a series of piers, some still connected by arches, where it crosses a small valley between Luynes and Fondettes.

See also
Communes of the Indre-et-Loire department

References

External links

Communes of Indre-et-Loire